Events in the year 2023 in the Federated States of Micronesia.

Incumbents
President: David W. Panuelo
Vice President: Aren Palik

Events
Ongoing — COVID-19 pandemic in Oceania

7 March – 2023 Micronesian parliamentary election

Deaths

References

 
2020s in the Federated States of Micronesia
Years of the 21st century in the Federated States of Micronesia
Micronesia
Micronesia